Lynnette Robin Ferguson  is a New Zealand academic, and as of 2021 is an emeritus professor at the University of Auckland. Ferguson has been a Fellow of the Royal Society Te Apārangi since 2016.

Academic career 
Ferguson says she initially wanted to be a hairdresser, until a stint at hairdressing school showed her she did not have the talent or interest for it.

After completing a Masters of Science with Honours at the University of Auckland, Ferguson completed a DPhil at the Department of Plant Sciences, University of Oxford, in 1975, with a thesis titled The Control of DNA Repair in Yeast. She returned to the University of Auckland School of Medicine for post-doctoral work, and then became an Auckland Cancer Society research career fellow.

Ferguson was promoted to full professor at the University of Auckland in 2000, when she established a new Department of Nutrition. She is now a emeritus professor at the University of Auckland.

Ferguson works on nutritional genomics, mutagenesis and the causes and control of chronic diseases such as inflammatory bowel disease. She has also worked on genes associated with satiety, the feeling of fullness after eating.

For ten years, Ferguson led Nutrigenomics New Zealand, which was a partnership between the University of Auckland, and three Crown Research Institutes: Crop & Food Research, AgResearch and HortResearch. Research focused on the genetics of inflammatory bowel disease and how personalised dietary changes could influence disease. This led to the first international conference on nutrigenomics and gut health, in 2006.

Honours and awards 
In the 2006 Queen's Birthday Honours, Ferguson was appointed a Companion of the Queen's Service Order for public services.

Ferguson was elected a Fellow of the Royal Society Te Apārangi in 2016. She is also a Fellow of the New Zealand Institute of Food Science and Technology.

Selected works

References

External links 
 Interview with Ferguson, explaining the concept of nutrigenomics on Our Changing World, Radio New Zealand

Living people
New Zealand women academics
Year of birth missing (living people)
Alumni of the University of Oxford
Academic staff of the University of Auckland
University of Auckland alumni
Companions of the Queen's Service Order
Fellows of the Royal Society of New Zealand